Denticula is a genus of diatoms in the family Bacillariaceae.

References

 Denticula at WoRMS

Bacillariales
Diatom genera
Taxa named by Friedrich Traugott Kützing